Laguna Lake may refer to:

 Laguna de Bay, the largest lake in the Philippines
 Laguna Lake (California), a lake in northern California, USA
 Laguna Lake (San Luis Obispo, California), a lake in San Luis Obispo, California, USA

See also
 Laguna (disambiguation)
 Lagoon (disambiguation)
 Lake (disambiguation)